Prince Philip, Duke of Edinburgh (born Prince Philip of Greece and Denmark, later Philip Mountbatten; 10 June 1921 – 9 April 2021) was the husband of Queen Elizabeth II. As such, he served as the consort of the British monarch from Elizabeth's accession as queen on 6 February 1952 until his death in 2021, making him the longest-serving royal consort in history.

Philip was born in Greece, into the Greek and Danish royal families; his family was exiled from the country when he was eighteen months old. After being educated in France, Germany, and the United Kingdom, he joined the Royal Navy in 1939, when he was 18 years old. In July 1939, he began corresponding with the 13-year-old Princess Elizabeth, the elder daughter and heir presumptive of King George VI. Philip had first met her in 1934. During the Second World War, he served with distinction in the British Mediterranean and Pacific fleets.

In the summer of 1946, the King granted Philip permission to marry Elizabeth. Before the official announcement of their engagement in July 1947, Philip stopped using his Greek and Danish royal titles and styles, became a naturalised British subject, and adopted his maternal grandparents' surname Mountbatten. He married Elizabeth on 20 November 1947. The day prior to their wedding, the King granted Philip the style His Royal Highness. On the day of their wedding, he was additionally created Duke of Edinburgh, Earl of Merioneth, and Baron Greenwich. Philip left active military service when Elizabeth ascended the throne in 1952, having reached the rank of commander. In 1957, he was created a British prince. Philip had four children with Elizabeth: Charles, Anne, Andrew, and Edward.

A sports enthusiast, Philip helped develop the equestrian event of carriage driving. He was a patron, president, or member of over 780 organisations, including the World Wide Fund for Nature, and served as chairman of The Duke of Edinburgh's Award, a youth awards program for people aged 14 to 24. Philip is the longest-lived male member of the British royal family. He retired from his royal duties on 2 August 2017, aged 96, having completed 22,219 solo engagements and 5,493 speeches from 1952. Philip died in 2021 at Windsor Castle, at the age of 99.

Early life and education 

Prince Philip of Greece and Denmark was born on the dining room table in Mon Repos, a villa on the Greek island of Corfu, on 10 June 1921. He was the only son and fifth and final child of Prince Andrew of Greece and Denmark and Princess Alice of Battenberg. A member of the House of Glücksburg, the ruling house of Denmark, he was a prince of both Greece and Denmark by virtue of his patrilineal descent from King George I of Greece and King Christian IX of Denmark; he was from birth in the line of succession to both thrones. Philip's four elder sisters were Margarita, Theodora, Cecilie, and Sophie. He was baptised in the Greek Orthodox rite at St. George's Church in the Old Fortress in Corfu. His godparents were his grandmother Queen Olga of Greece, his cousin Crown Prince George of Greece, his uncle Lord Louis Mountbatten, and the mayor of Corfu, Alexandros Kokotos.

Shortly after Philip's birth, his maternal grandfather, Prince Louis of Battenberg, then known as Louis Mountbatten, Marquess of Milford Haven, died in London. Louis was a naturalised British subject who, after a career in the Royal Navy, had renounced his German titles and adopted the surname Mountbatten – an Anglicised version of Battenberg – during the First World War, owing to anti-German sentiment in the United Kingdom. After visiting London for his grandfather's memorial service, Philip and his mother returned to Greece, where Prince Andrew had remained to command a Greek Army division embroiled in the Greco-Turkish War.

Greece suffered great losses in the war, and the Turks made large gains. Philip's uncle and high commander of the Greek expeditionary force, King Constantine I, was blamed for the defeat and was forced to abdicate on 27 September 1922. The new military government arrested Prince Andrew, along with others. The commanding officer of the army, General Georgios Hatzianestis, and five senior politicians were arrested, tried, and executed in the Trial of the Six. Prince Andrew's life was also believed to be in danger, and Princess Alice was under surveillance. Finally, in December, a revolutionary court banished Prince Andrew from Greece for life. The British naval vessel  evacuated Andrew's family, with Philip carried to safety in a fruit box.

Philip's family went to France, where they settled in the Paris suburb of Saint-Cloud in a house lent to them by his wealthy aunt, Princess George of Greece and Denmark. During his time there, Philip was first educated at The Elms, an American school in Paris run by Donald MacJannet, who described Philip as a "know it all smarty person, but always remarkably polite". In 1930, Philip was sent to the United Kingdom, living with his maternal grandmother, Victoria Mountbatten, Dowager Marchioness of Milford Haven, at Kensington Palace and his uncle George Mountbatten, 2nd Marquess of Milford Haven, at Lynden Manor in Bray, Berkshire. He was then enrolled at Cheam School. Over the next three years, his four sisters married German princes and moved to Germany, his mother was diagnosed with schizophrenia and placed in an asylum, and his father took up residence in Monte Carlo. Philip had little contact with his mother for the remainder of his childhood.

In 1933, Philip was sent to Schule Schloss Salem in Germany, which had the "advantage of saving school fees", because it was owned by the family of his brother-in-law Berthold, Margrave of Baden. With the rise of Nazism in Germany, Salem's Jewish founder, Kurt Hahn, fled persecution and founded Gordonstoun School in Scotland, to which Philip moved after two terms at Salem.  In 1937, his sister Cecilie; her husband, Georg Donatus, Hereditary Grand Duke of Hesse; her two young sons, Ludwig and Alexander; her newborn infant; and her mother-in-law were killed in an air crash at Ostend; Philip, then 16 years old, attended the funeral in Darmstadt. Cecilie and Georg Donatus were members of the Nazi Party. The following year, Philip's uncle and guardian Lord Milford Haven died of bone marrow cancer. Milford Haven's younger brother Lord Louis took parental responsibility for Philip for the remainder of his youth.

Because Philip left Greece as an infant, he did not speak Greek. In 1992, he said that he "could understand a certain amount". He stated that he thought of himself as Danish, and his family spoke English, French, and German. Philip was raised as a Greek Orthodox Christian. As a teenager, he was involved with German Protestantism. Known for his charm in his youth, Philip was linked to a number of women, including Osla Benning.

Naval and wartime service 

After leaving Gordonstoun in early 1939, Philip completed a term as a cadet at the Royal Naval College, Dartmouth, then repatriated to Greece, living with his mother in Athens for a month in mid-1939. At the behest of King George II of Greece, his first cousin, he returned to Britain in September to resume training for the Royal Navy. He graduated from Dartmouth the next year as the best cadet in his course. During the Second World War, he continued to serve in the British forces, while two of his brothers-in-law, Prince Christoph of Hesse and Berthold, Margrave of Baden, fought on the opposing German side. Philip was appointed as a midshipman in January 1940. After the invasion of Greece by Italy in October 1940, he was transferred from the Indian Ocean to the battleship  in the Mediterranean Fleet.

On 1 February 1941, Philip was commissioned as a sub-lieutenant after a series of courses at Portsmouth, in which he gained the top grade in four out of five sections of the qualifying examination. Among other engagements, he was involved in the Battle of Crete and was mentioned in dispatches for his service during the Battle of Cape Matapan, in which he controlled the battleship's searchlights. He was also awarded the Greek War Cross. In June 1942, he was appointed to the destroyer , which was involved in convoy escort tasks on the east coast of Britain, as well as the Allied invasion of Sicily.

Promotion to lieutenant followed on 16 July 1942. In October of the same year, aged 21, Philip became first lieutenant of HMS Wallace. He was one of the youngest first lieutenants in the Royal Navy. During the invasion of Sicily, in July 1943, as second in command of Wallace, he saved his ship from a night bomber attack. He devised a plan to launch a raft with smoke floats that successfully distracted the bombers, allowing the ship to slip away unnoticed. In 1944, he moved on to the new destroyer, where he saw service with the British Pacific Fleet in the 27th Destroyer Flotilla. He was present in Tokyo Bay when the Japanese Instrument of Surrender was signed.

Marriage 

In 1939, King George VI and Queen Elizabeth toured the Royal Naval College, Dartmouth. During the visit, the Queen and Lord Louis Mountbatten asked his nephew Philip to escort the royal couple's daughters, Elizabeth and Margaret, who were Philip's third cousins through Queen Victoria of the United Kingdom and second cousins once removed through King Christian IX of Denmark. Princess Elizabeth fell in love with Philip, and they began to exchange letters when she was 13.

Eventually, in the summer of 1946, Philip asked George VI for his daughter's hand in marriage. The King granted his request, provided that any formal engagement be delayed until Elizabeth's 21st birthday the following April. By March 1947, Philip had adopted the surname Mountbatten from his mother's family, and had stopped using his Greek and Danish royal titles upon becoming a naturalised British subject. The engagement was announced to the public on 9 July 1947.

The engagement attracted some controversy. Philip had no financial standing, was foreign-born, and had sisters who had married German noblemen with Nazi links. Marion Crawford wrote, "Some of the King's advisors did not think him good enough for her. He was a prince without a home or kingdom. Some of the papers played long and loud tunes on the string of Philip's foreign origin." Later biographies reported that Elizabeth's mother had reservations about the union initially, and teased Philip as "the Hun". In later life, however, she told the biographer Tim Heald that Philip was "an English gentleman".

Though Philip appeared "always to have regarded himself as an Anglican", and he had attended Anglican services with his classmates and relations in England and throughout his Royal Navy days, he had been baptised in the Greek Orthodox Church. The Archbishop of Canterbury, Geoffrey Fisher, wanted to "regularise" Philip's position by officially receiving him into the Church of England, which he did in October 1947.

The day before the wedding, King George VI bestowed the style of Royal Highness on Philip, and, on the morning of the wedding, 20 November 1947, he was made the Duke of Edinburgh, Earl of Merioneth, and Baron Greenwich of Greenwich in the County of London. Consequently, being already a Knight of the Garter, between 19 and 20 November 1947, he bore the unusual style Lieutenant His Royal Highness Sir Philip Mountbatten and is so described in the Letters Patent of 20 November 1947.

Philip and Elizabeth were married in a ceremony at Westminster Abbey, recorded and broadcast by BBC radio to 200 million people around the world. In post-war Britain, it was not acceptable for any of the Duke of Edinburgh's German relations to be invited to the wedding, including Philip's three surviving sisters, all of whom had married German princes. After their marriage, the Duke and Duchess of Edinburgh took up residence at Clarence House. Their first two children were born before Elizabeth succeeded her father as monarch in 1952: Prince Charles in 1948 and Princess Anne in 1950. Their marriage was the longest of any British monarch, lasting more than 73 years until Philip's death in 2021. Concerned by her father's poor health, Elizabeth insisted that Philip give up smoking, which he did, cold turkey, on their wedding day.

Philip was introduced to the House of Lords on 21 July 1948, immediately before his uncle Louis Mountbatten, who had been made Earl Mountbatten of Burma. Philip ostensibly never spoke in the House of Lords. He, his sons and other royals ceased to be members of the House of Lords following the House of Lords Act 1999, although Philip's former brother-in-law, Lord Snowdon, remained in the House.

Early duties 

After his honeymoon at the Mountbatten family home, Broadlands, Philip returned to the navy, at first in a desk job at the Admiralty and later on a staff course at the Naval Staff College, Greenwich. From 1949, he was stationed in Malta (residing at Villa Guardamangia) after being posted as the first lieutenant of the destroyer , the lead ship of the 1st Destroyer Flotilla in the Mediterranean Fleet. On 16 July 1950, he was promoted to lieutenant commander and given command of the frigate . On 30 June 1952, Philip was promoted to commander, though his active naval career had ended in July 1951.

With the King in ill health, Elizabeth and Philip were both appointed to the Privy Council on 4 November 1951, after a coast-to-coast tour of Canada. At the end of January 1952, the couple set out on a tour of the Commonwealth. On 6 February 1952, they were in Kenya when Elizabeth's father died and she became queen. It was Philip who broke the news to Elizabeth at Sagana Lodge, and the royal party immediately returned to the United Kingdom.

On 5 December 1952, Philip was initiated into Freemasonry by the Worshipful Master of Navy Lodge No 2612, honouring a commitment he had made to George VI, who had made it clear that he expected Philip to maintain the tradition of royal patronage of Freemasonry. However, according to one journalist writing in 1983, both Philip's mother-in-law and his uncle Lord Mountbatten had unfavourable views of Freemasonry; after his initiation, Philip took no further part in the organisation. Although as consort of the Queen, he might in time have been made Grand Master of British Freemasonry, Elizabeth's cousin Edward, Duke of Kent, assumed that role in 1967. Philip's son Charles apparently never joined Freemasonry.

Consort of the Queen

Royal house 

Elizabeth's accession to the throne brought up the question of the name of the royal house, as Elizabeth would typically have taken Philip's last name upon marriage. His uncle the Earl Mountbatten of Burma advocated the name House of Mountbatten. Philip suggested House of Edinburgh after his ducal title. When Elizabeth's grandmother Queen Mary heard of this, she informed British prime minister Winston Churchill, who later advised Elizabeth to issue a royal proclamation declaring that the royal house was to remain known as the House of Windsor. Philip privately complained, "I am nothing but a bloody amoeba. I am the only man in the country not allowed to give his name to his own children".

On 8 February 1960, the Queen issued an Order in Council declaring that Mountbatten-Windsor would be the surname of her and her husband's male-line descendants who are not styled as Royal Highness or titled as prince or princess. While it seems Elizabeth had "absolutely set her heart" on such a change and had it in mind for some time, it occurred only 11 days before the birth of their third child, Prince Andrew, and only after three months of protracted correspondence between English constitutional expert Edward Iwi (who averred that, without such a change, the royal child would be born with "the Badge of Bastardy") and Prime Minister Harold Macmillan, who had attempted to refute Iwi's arguments.

After she acceded to the throne, Elizabeth also announced that Philip was to have "place, pre-eminence and precedence" next to her "on all occasions and in all meetings, except where otherwise provided by Act of Parliament". In fact, however, he attended Parliament only when escorting Elizabeth for the annual State Opening of Parliament, where he walked and sat beside her. Contrary to rumours over the years, Elizabeth and Philip were said by insiders to have had a strong relationship throughout their marriage, despite the challenges of Elizabeth's reign. The Queen referred to Prince Philip in a speech on the occasion of her Diamond Jubilee in 2012 as her "constant strength and guide".

Prince Philip received a Parliamentary annuity (of £359,000 since 1990) that served to meet official expenses in carrying out public duties. The annuity was unaffected by the reform of royal finances under the Sovereign Grant Act 2011. Any part of the allowance that was not used to meet official expenditure was liable for tax. In practice, the entire allowance was used to fund his official duties.

Supporting the Queen 

As consort to the Queen, Philip supported his wife in her new duties as sovereign, accompanying her to ceremonies such as the State Opening of Parliament in various countries, state dinners, and tours abroad. As chairman of the Coronation Commission, he was the first member of the royal family to fly in a helicopter, visiting the troops that were to take part in the ceremony. Philip was not himself crowned in the coronation service, but knelt before Elizabeth, with her hands enclosing his, and swore to be her "liege man of life and limb".

In the early 1950s, Philip's sister-in-law Princess Margaret considered marrying a divorced older man, Peter Townsend. The press accused Philip of being hostile to the match, to which he replied: "I haven't done anything." Philip had not interfered, preferring to stay out of other people's love lives. Eventually, Margaret and Townsend parted. For six months, over 1953–1954, Philip and Elizabeth toured the Commonwealth; as with previous tours, the children were left in Britain.

In 1956, the Duke, with Kurt Hahn, founded The Duke of Edinburgh's Award to give young people "a sense of responsibility to themselves and their communities". In the same year, he also established the Commonwealth Study Conferences. From 1956 to 1957, Philip travelled around the world aboard the newly commissioned , during which he opened the 1956 Summer Olympics in Melbourne and visited the Antarctic, becoming the first royal to cross the Antarctic Circle. Elizabeth and the children remained in the UK. On the return leg of the journey, Philip's private secretary, Mike Parker, was sued for divorce by his wife. As with Townsend, the press still portrayed divorce as a scandal, and eventually, Parker resigned. He later said that the Duke was very supportive and "the Queen was wonderful throughout. She regarded divorce as a sadness, not a hanging offence." In a public show of support, Elizabeth created Parker a Commander of the Royal Victorian Order.

Further press reports claimed that the royal couple were drifting apart, which enraged Philip and dismayed Elizabeth, who issued a strongly worded denial. On 22 February 1957, she granted her husband the style and title of a Prince of the United Kingdom by Letters Patent; it was gazetted that he was to be known as "His Royal Highness The Prince Philip, Duke of Edinburgh". Philip was appointed to the Queen's Privy Council for Canada on 14 October 1957, taking his Oath of Allegiance before the Queen in person at her Canadian residence, Rideau Hall. Remarks he made two years later to the Canadian Medical Association on the subject of youth and sport were taken as a suggestion that Canadian children were out of shape. This was at first considered "tactless", but Philip was later admired for his encouragement of physical fitness. While in Canada in 1969, Philip spoke about his views on republicanism:

In 1960, Philip attended the National Eisteddfod of Wales wearing a long green robe, where he was initiated as an Honorary Ovate by the Archdruid of Wales Edgar Phillips through his bardic name Philip Meirionnydd, to reflect his title of Earl of Merioneth. In 1961, he became the first member of the royal family to be interviewed on television, after he appeared on Panorama to answer questions by Richard Dimbleby about the Commonwealth Technical Training Week, an initiative of which he was patron. In 1969, he made a similar appearance on Meet the Press during a tour of North America.

Charities and patronages 

Philip was patron of some 800 organisations, particularly focused on the environment, industry, sport, and education. His first solo engagement as Duke of Edinburgh was in March 1948, presenting prizes at the boxing finals of the London Federation of Boys' Clubs at the Royal Albert Hall. He was president of the National Playing Fields Association (now known as Fields in Trust) for 64 years, from 1947 until his grandson Prince William took over the role in 2013. He was appointed a fellow of the Royal Society in 1951. In 1952, he became patron of The Industrial Society (since renamed The Work Foundation). In the same year and after his father-in-law's death, he took over the role of the Ranger of Windsor Great Park, overseeing its protection and maintenance. From 1955 to 1957, he was president of The Football Association and served two terms as president of Marylebone Cricket Club, with his tenures starting in 1949 and 1974, respectively. In the same decade, he became the first patron of Lord's Taverners, a youth cricket and disability sports charity, for which he organised fundraising events. Between 1959 and 1965 Prince Philip was the president of BAFTA. He helped found the Australian Conservation Foundation in 1963 and the World Wildlife Fund in 1961 and served as the latter's UK president from 1961 to 1982, international president from 1981, and president emeritus from 1996. He was also president of the Zoological Society of London for two decades and was appointed an honorary fellow in 1977. Despite his involvement in initiatives for conserving nature, he was also criticised for practices such as fox hunting and shooting of game birds and the killing of a tiger in India in 1961. He was president of the International Equestrian Federation from 1964 to 1986, and served as chancellor of the universities of Cambridge, Edinburgh, Salford, and Wales. In 1965, at the suggestion of Prime Minister Harold Wilson, Philip became chair to a scheme set up for awarding industrial innovations, which later became known as the Queen's Awards for Enterprise. In the same year, Philip became president of the Council of Engineering Institutions and in that capacity he assisted with the inception of the Fellowship of Engineering (later the Royal Academy of Engineering), of which he later became the senior fellow. He also commissioned the Prince Philip Designers Prize and the Prince Philip Medal to recognise designers and engineers with exceptional contributions. In 1970, he was involved with the founding of The Maritime Trust for restoring and preserving historic British ships. In 2017, the British Heart Foundation thanked Prince Philip for being its patron for 55 years, during which time, in addition to organising fundraisers, he "supported the creation of nine BHF-funded centres of excellence". He was an honorary fellow of St Edmund's College, Cambridge.

Charles and Diana 
At the beginning of 1981, Philip wrote to his son Charles, counselling him to make up his mind to either propose to Lady Diana Spencer or break off their courtship. Charles felt pressured by his father to make a decision and did so, proposing to Diana in February. They married five months later. By 1992, the marriage of the Prince and Princess of Wales had broken down. Elizabeth and Philip hosted a meeting between Charles and Diana, trying to effect a reconciliation, but without success. Philip wrote to Diana, expressing his disappointment at both Charles's and her extra-marital affairs, and asking her to examine both his and her behaviour from the other's point of view. She found the letters hard to take but nevertheless appreciated that he was acting with good intent. Charles and Diana separated before the end of 1992 and were divorced in 1996.

A year after the divorce, Diana was killed in a car crash in Paris on 31 August 1997. At the time, Philip was on holiday at Balmoral with the extended royal family. In their grief, Diana's two sons, Princes William and Harry, wanted to attend church, so Elizabeth and Philip took them that morning. For five days, the royal couple shielded their grandsons from the ensuing press interest by keeping them at Balmoral, where they could grieve in private. The royal family's seclusion caused public dismay, but the public mood changed after a live broadcast made by Elizabeth on 5 September. Uncertain as to whether they should walk behind her coffin during the funeral procession, Diana's sons hesitated. Philip told William: "If you don't walk, I think you'll regret it later. If I walk, will you walk with me?" On the day of the funeral, Philip, William, Harry, Charles, and Diana's brother, Earl Spencer, walked through London behind her bier.

Over the next few years, Mohamed Al-Fayed, whose son Dodi Fayed was also killed in the crash, claimed that Philip had ordered the death of Diana and that the accident was staged. The inquest into Diana's death concluded in 2008 that there was no evidence of a conspiracy.

Longevity 

In April 2009, Philip became the longest-serving British royal consort, surpassing Charlotte of Mecklenburg-Strelitz, wife of George III. He became the oldest-ever male British royal in February 2013 and the third-longest-lived member of the British royal family (following Princess Alice, Duchess of Gloucester, and Queen Elizabeth The Queen Mother) in April 2019. Personally, he was not enthused about living an extremely long life, remarking in a 2000 interview (when he was 79) that he could not "imagine anything worse" and had "no desire whatsoever" to become a centenarian, saying "bits of me are falling off already".

In 2008, Philip was admitted to King Edward VII's Hospital, London, for a chest infection; he walked into the hospital unaided, recovered quickly, and was discharged three days later. After the Evening Standard reported that Philip had prostate cancer, Buckingham Palacewhich usually refuses to comment on health rumoursdenied the story and the paper retracted it.

In June 2011, in an interview marking his 90th birthday, Philip said that he would now slow down and reduce his duties, stating that he had "done [his] bit". His wife, the Queen, gave him the title Lord High Admiral for his 90th birthday. While staying at Sandringham House, the royal residence in Norfolk, on 23 December 2011, the Duke suffered chest pains and was taken to the cardio-thoracic unit at Papworth Hospital, Cambridgeshire, where he underwent successful coronary angioplasty and stenting. He was discharged on 27 December.

On 4 June 2012, during the celebrations in honour of his wife's Diamond Jubilee, Philip was taken from Windsor Castle to King Edward VII's Hospital suffering from a bladder infection. He was discharged from hospital on 9 June. After a recurrence of infection in August 2012, while staying at Balmoral Castle, he was admitted to Aberdeen Royal Infirmary for five nights as a precautionary measure. In June 2013, Philip was admitted to the London Clinic for an exploratory operation on his abdomen, spending 11 days in hospital. On 21 May 2014, he appeared in public with a bandage on his right hand after a "minor procedure" was performed in Buckingham Palace the preceding day. Tony Abbott's surprise 2015 decision to make Philip a Knight of the Order of Australia was widely criticised in the country and contributed to Abbott's ouster as its prime minister. In June 2017, Philip was taken from Windsor to London and admitted to King Edward VII's Hospital after being diagnosed with an infection. He spent two nights in the hospital and was unable to attend the State Opening of Parliament and Royal Ascot.

Final years and retirement 

Prince Philip retired from his royal duties on 2 August 2017, meeting Royal Marines in his final solo public engagement, aged 96. Since 1952, he had completed 22,219 solo engagements. British prime minister Theresa May thanked him for "a remarkable lifetime of service". On 20 November 2017, he celebrated his 70th wedding anniversary with Elizabeth, which made her the first British monarch to celebrate a platinum wedding anniversary.

On 3 April 2018, Philip was admitted to King Edward VII's Hospital for a planned hip replacement, which took place the next day. This came after the Duke missed the annual Maundy and Easter Sunday services. On 12 April, his daughter, Princess Anne, spent about 50 minutes in the hospital and afterwards said her father was "on good form". He was discharged the following day. On 19 May, six weeks later, he attended the wedding of his grandson Prince Harry to Meghan Markle and was able to walk with Elizabeth unaided. That October, he accompanied Elizabeth to the wedding of their granddaughter Princess Eugenie to Jack Brooksbank, with The Telegraph reporting that Philip works on a "wake up and see how I feel" basis when deciding whether to attend an event or not.

On 17 January 2019, 97-year-old Philip was involved in a car crash as he drove out onto a main road near the Sandringham Estate. An official statement said he was uninjured. An eyewitness who came to the prince's aid described having to wipe blood off his hands. The driver and a passenger of the other car were injured and taken to hospital. Philip attended hospital the next morning as a precaution. He apologised, and three weeks later voluntarily surrendered his driving licence. On 14 February, the Crown Prosecution Service announced that prosecuting Philip would not be in the public interest. Philip was still allowed to drive around private estates, and was seen behind the wheel in the grounds of Windsor Castle in April 2019.

From 20 to 24 December 2019, Philip stayed at King Edward VII's Hospital and received treatment for a "pre-existing condition", in a visit described by Buckingham Palace as a "precautionary measure". He had not been seen in public since attending Lady Gabriella Kingston's wedding in May 2019. A photo of the royal couple as they isolated at Windsor Castle during the COVID-19 pandemic was released ahead of his 99th birthday in June 2020. In July 2020, he stepped down as Colonel-in-Chief of The Rifles, a position he had held since 2007. He was succeeded by his daughter-in-law Camilla, Duchess of Cornwall.

On 9 January 2021, Philip and Elizabeth were vaccinated against COVID-19 by a household doctor at Windsor Castle. On 16 February 2021, Philip was admitted to King Edward VII's Hospital as a "precautionary measure" after feeling unwell. He was visited by Prince Charles on 20 February. On 23 February, it was confirmed by Buckingham Palace that Philip was "responding to treatment" for an infection. On 1 March 2021, Philip was transferred by ambulance to St Bartholomew's Hospital to continue treatment for an infection, and additionally to undergo "testing and observation" relating to a pre-existing heart condition. He underwent a successful procedure for his heart condition on 3 March and was transferred back to King Edward VII's Hospital on 5 March. He was discharged on 16 March and returned to Windsor Castle.

Death 

Philip died of "old age" on the morning of 9 April 2021 at Windsor Castle, at the age of 99. He was the longest-serving royal consort in world history. Elizabeth, who was reportedly at her husband's bedside when he died, described his death as "having left a huge void in her life".

The palace said Philip died peacefully, which was confirmed by his daughter-in-law Sophie, Countess of Wessex, who told the press it was "so gentle. It was just like somebody took him by the hand and off he went." His death led to the commencement of Operation Forth Bridge, the plan for publicly announcing his death and organising his funeral. The usual public ceremonial could not take place because of the regulations for the COVID-19 pandemic which restricted the number of mourners to thirty; it was later reported in the press that Elizabeth had rejected a government offer to relax the rules. The funeral took place on 17 April 2021 at St George's Chapel, Windsor Castle, and he was temporarily interred alongside 25 other coffins, including George III, in the Royal Vault inside St George's. Representatives of countries around the world sent condolences to the royal family upon his death.

As is precedent for senior members of the royal family, Philip's last will and testament will be sealed for at least 90 years, according to a High Court ruling, which deemed it necessary to protect the "dignity and standing" of the Queen. This led to speculation that the will might contain material harmful to the reputation of the royal family. The order was made by the President of the Family Division after a private hearing in July 2021, who said that he had neither seen the will nor been informed of any of its contents. In January 2022, The Guardian challenged the judge's decision to exclude the press from that hearing, arguing that the judge had "erred by failing to consider any lesser interference with open justice than a private hearing", and the newspaper was granted leave to appeal. In July 2022, the Court of Appeal dismissed the newspaper's arguments, stating that the press could not have been informed of the hearing "without risking the media storm that was feared". The court added that "a perceived lack of transparency might be a matter of legitimate public debate, but the (Non-Contentious Probate Rules) allow wills and their values to be concealed from the public gaze in some cases".

A service of thanksgiving for Philip's life took place at Westminster Abbey on 29 March 2022 with Elizabeth, foreign royalty and politicians in attendance.

The bodies of Philip and Elizabeth were interred in the King George VI Memorial Chapel at St George's, on the evening of 19 September 2022, at the conclusion of Elizabeth's state funeral.

Legacy

Interests 

Philip played polo until 1971, when he started to compete in carriage driving, a sport which he helped to expand; the early rule book was drafted under his supervision. He was also a keen yachtsman and struck up a friendship in 1949 with boat designer and sailing enthusiast Uffa Fox, in Cowes. Philip and Elizabeth regularly attended Cowes Week in HMY Britannia.

Philip's first airborne flying lesson took place in 1952, and by his 70th birthday he had accrued 5,150 pilot hours. He was presented with Royal Air Force wings in 1953, helicopter wings with the Royal Navy in 1956, and his private pilot's license in 1959. After 44 years as a pilot, he retired in August 1997 with 5,986 hours spent in 59 different aircraft. In April 2014, it was reported that an old British Pathé newsreel film had been discovered of Philip's 1962 two-month flying tour of South America. Filmed sitting alongside Philip at the aircraft's controls was his co-pilot Captain Peter Middleton, the grandfather of Philip's granddaughter-in-law Catherine. In 1959, he flew solo in a Druine Turbulent, becoming the first and, the only member of the royal family to have flown a single-seat aircraft.

Philip painted with oils and collected artworks, including contemporary cartoons, which hang at Buckingham Palace, Windsor Castle, Sandringham House, and Balmoral Castle. Hugh Casson described Philip's own artwork as "exactly what you'd expect ... totally direct, no hanging about. Strong colours, vigorous brushstrokes." He was patron of the Royal Society of Arts from 1952 until 2011. He was "fascinated" by cartoons about the monarchy and the royal family and was a patron of The Cartoon Museum.

Personality and image 

Philip's down-to-earth manner was attested to by a White House butler, who recalled that, on a visit in 1976, Philip engaged him and a fellow butler in a conversation and poured them drinks. As well as a reputation for bluntness and plain speaking, Philip was noted for occasionally making observations and jokes that have been construed as either funny, or as gaffes: awkward, politically incorrect, or even offensive, but sometimes perceived as stereotypical of someone of his age and background. In an address to the General Dental Council in 1960, he jokingly coined a new word for his blunders: "Dontopedalogy is the science of opening your mouth and putting your foot in it, a science which I have practised for a good many years." Later in life, he suggested his comments may have contributed to the perception that he was "a cantankerous old sod".

During a state visit to China in 1986, in a private conversation with British students from Xi'an's Northwest University, Philip joked: "If you stay here much longer, you'll go slit-eyed." The British press reported on the remark as indicative of racial intolerance, but the Chinese authorities were reportedly unconcerned. Chinese students studying in the UK, an official explained, were often told in jest not to stay away too long, lest they go "round-eyed". His comment had no effect on Sino-British relations, but it shaped his own reputation. Philip also made comments on the eating habits of Cantonese people, stating: "If it has four legs and is not a chair, has wings and is not an airplane, or swims and is not a submarine, the Cantonese will eat it." In Australia he asked an Indigenous Australian entrepreneur: "Do you still throw spears at each other?"

In 2011, the historian David Starkey described Philip as a kind of "HRH Victor Meldrew". For example, in May 1999, British newspapers accused Philip of insulting deaf children at a pop concert in Wales by saying: "No wonder you are deaf listening to this row." Later, Philip wrote: "The story is largely invention. It so happens that my mother was quite seriously deaf and I have been Patron of the Royal National Institute for the Deaf for ages, so it's hardly likely that I would do any such thing." When he and his wife met Stephen Menary, an army cadet blinded by a Real IRA bomb, and Elizabeth enquired how much sight he retained, Philip quipped: "Not a lot, judging by the tie he's wearing." Menary later said: "I think he just tries to put people at ease by trying to make a joke. I certainly didn't take any offence." Philip's comparison of prostitutes and wives was also perceived as offensive after he reportedly stated: "I don't think a prostitute is more moral than a wife, but they are doing the same thing."

Centenary 
To mark Prince Philip's centenary, the Royal Collection Trust held an exhibition at Windsor Castle and the Palace of Holyroodhouse. Titled Prince Philip: A Celebration, it showcased around 150 personal items related to him, including his wedding card, wedding menu, midshipman's logbook from 1940–41, chair of estate, and the coronation robes and coronet that he wore for his wife's coronation in 1953. George Alexis Weymouth's portrait of Philip in the ruins of the castle after the fire of 1992 formed part of a focus on Philip's involvement with the subsequent restoration.

The Royal Horticultural Society also marked Philip's centenary by breeding a new rose in his honour. Created by British rose breeder Harkness Roses, it was christened 'The Duke of Edinburgh Rose'. The Queen, Patron of the Royal Horticultural Society, was given the deep pink commemorative rose in honour of her husband, and she remarked that "It looks lovely". A Duke of Edinburgh Rose has since been planted in the mixed rose border of Windsor Castle's East Terrace Garden. Philip played a major role in the garden's design.

In September 2021, the Royal National Lifeboat Institution honoured Philip by naming their new state-of-the-art lifeboat Duke of Edinburgh. The tribute was originally planned to mark his 100th birthday. In the same month, a documentary originally planned for his centenary was broadcast on BBC One under the title Prince Philip: The Royal Family Remembers, with contributions from his children, son-in-law, daughters-in-law, and seven of his grandchildren.

Portrayals 
Philip has been portrayed by several actors, including Stewart Granger (The Royal Romance of Charles and Diana, 1982), Christopher Lee (Charles & Diana: A Royal Love Story, 1982), David Threlfall (The Queen's Sister, 2005), James Cromwell (The Queen, 2006), and Finn Elliot, Matt Smith, Tobias Menzies, and Jonathan Pryce (The Crown, 2016 onwards).

Prince Philip appears as a fictional character in Nevil Shute's novel In the Wet (1952), Paul Gallico's novel Mrs. 'Arris Goes to Moscow (1974), Tom Clancy's novel Patriot Games (1987), and Sue Townsend's novel The Queen and I (1992). In John Gardner's 1964 novel The Liquidator, subsequently filmed, the story concludes after the central character, Boysie Oakes, is set up by a double agent to make a staged but unsuccessful assassination attempt on the Duke of Edinburgh when the latter visits an RAF base.

Books 
Philip authored a number of books:

 Selected Speeches – 1948–55 (1957; revised paperback edition published by Nabu Press, 2011), 
 Selected Speeches – 1956–59 (1960)
 Birds from Britannia (1962; published in the United States as Seabirds from Southern Waters), 
 Wildlife Crisis with James Fisher (1970), 
 The Environmental Revolution: Speeches on Conservation, 1962–1977 (1978), 
 Competition Carriage Driving (1982; published in France, 1984; second edition, 1984; revised edition, 1994), 
 A Question of Balance (1982), 
 Men, Machines and Sacred Cows (1984), 
 A Windsor Correspondence with Michael Mann (1984), 
 Down to Earth: Collected Writings and Speeches on Man and the Natural World 1961–87 (1988; paperback edition, 1989; Japanese edition, 1992), 
 Survival or Extinction: A Christian Attitude to the Environment with Michael Mann (1989), 
 Driving and Judging Dressage (1996), 
 30 Years On, and Off, the Box Seat (2004), 

Forewords to:

 Royal Australian Navy 1911–1961 Jubilee Souvenir issued by authority of the Department of the Navy, Canberra (1961)
 The Concise British Flora in Colour by William Keble Martin, Ebury Press / Michael Joseph (1965)
 Birds of Town and Village by William Donald Campbell and Basil Ede (1965)
 Kurt Hahn by Hermann Röhrs and Hilary Tunstall-Behrens (1970)
 The Doomsday Book of Animals by David Day (1981)
 Saving the Animals: The World Wildlife Fund Book of Conservation by Bernard Stonehouse (1981)
 The Art of Driving by Max Pape (1982), 
 Yachting and the Royal Prince Alfred Yacht Club by Graeme Norman (1988), 
 National Maritime Museum Guide to Maritime Britain by Keith Wheatley (2000)
 The Royal Yacht Britannia: The Official History by Richard Johnstone-Bryden, Conway Maritime Press (2003), 
 1953: The Crowning Year of Sport by Jonathan Rice (2003)
 British Flags and Emblems by Graham Bartram, Tuckwell Press (2004), 
 Chariots of War by Robert Hobson, Ulric Publication (2004), 
 RMS Queen Mary 2 Manual: An Insight into the Design, Construction and Operation of the World's Largest Ocean Liner by Stephen Payne, Haynes Publishing (2014)
 The Triumph of a Great Tradition: The Story of Cunard's 175 Years by Eric Flounders and Michael Gallagher, Lily Publications (2014),

Titles, styles, honours, and arms 

Philip held many titles throughout his life. Originally holding the title and style of a prince of Greece and Denmark, Philip abandoned these royal titles before he married and was thereafter created a British duke, among other noble titles. Elizabeth formally issued letters patent in 1957 making him a British prince.

When addressing the Duke of Edinburgh, as with any male member of the royal family except the monarch, the rules of etiquette were to address him the first time as Your Royal Highness, and thereafter as Sir.

Honours and honorary military appointments 
Philip was awarded medals from Britain, France, and Greece for his service during World War II, as well as ones commemorating the coronations of George VI and Elizabeth II and the silver, gold and diamond jubilees of Elizabeth. On 19 November 1947, the eve of his wedding, George VI appointed him to the Order of the Garter. Since then, Philip received 17 different appointments and decorations in the Commonwealth, and 48 from foreign states. The inhabitants of some villages on the island of Tanna, Vanuatu, worship Prince Philip as a god-like spiritual figure; the islanders possess portraits of Philip and hold feasts on his birthday.

Upon his wife's accession to the throne in 1952, Philip was appointed Admiral of the Sea Cadet Corps, Colonel-in-Chief of the British Army Cadet Force, and Air Commodore-in-Chief of the Air Training Corps. The following year, he was appointed to the equivalent positions in Canada and made Admiral of the Fleet, Captain General Royal Marines, Field Marshal, and Marshal of the Royal Air Force in the United Kingdom. Subsequent military appointments were made in New Zealand and Australia. In 1975, he was appointed Colonel of the Grenadier Guards, a position he handed over to his son Andrew in 2017. On 16 December 2015, he relinquished his role as Honorary Air Commodore-in-Chief and was succeeded by his granddaughter-in-law Catherine, Duchess of Cambridge, as Honorary Air Commandant.

To celebrate Philip's 90th birthday, Elizabeth appointed him Lord High Admiral, as well as to the highest ranks available in all three branches of the Canadian Armed Forces. On their 70th wedding anniversary, 20 November 2017, she appointed her husband Knight Grand Cross (GCVO) of the Royal Victorian Order, making him the first British national since his uncle Lord Mountbatten to be entitled to wear the breast stars of four orders of chivalry in the United Kingdom.

Arms

Issue

Ancestry 
Both Philip and Queen Elizabeth II were great-great-grandchildren of Queen Victoria, Elizabeth by descent from Victoria's eldest son, King Edward VII, and Philip by descent from Victoria's second daughter, Princess Alice. Both were also descended from King Christian IX of Denmark.

Philip was also related to the House of Romanov through all four of his grandparents. His paternal grandmother Grand Duchess Olga Constantinovna of Russia was the granddaughter of Emperor Nicholas I of Russia. His paternal grandfather George I of Greece, born Prince William of Denmark, was a brother of Maria Feodorovna (Dagmar of Denmark), wife of Emperor Alexander III. His maternal grandmother, Princess Victoria of Hesse and by Rhine, was a sister of Alexandra Feodorovna (Alix of Hesse), wife of Emperor Nicholas II, and Elizabeth Feodorovna (Elisabeth of Hesse), wife of  Grand Duke Sergei Alexandrovich of Russia. His maternal grandfather Prince Louis of Battenberg was the nephew of Maria Alexandrovna (Marie of Hesse), who was the wife of Emperor Alexander II.

In 1993, scientists were able to confirm the identity of the remains of several members of the Romanov family, more than seventy years after their deaths in 1918, by comparing their mitochondrial DNA to living matrilineal relatives, including Philip. Philip, Alexandra Feodorovna, and her children are all descended from Princess Alice, the daughter of Queen Victoria, through a purely female line.

Notes

References

Citations

Bibliography

External links 

 The Duke of Edinburgh at the Royal Family website
 Prince Philip, Duke of Edinburgh at the website of the Royal Collection Trust
 The Duke of Edinburgh's Award
 
 
 

1921 births
2021 deaths
20th-century British writers
21st-century British writers
Alumni of Schule Schloss Salem
Barons Greenwich
Battenberg family
British Anglicans
British environmentalists
British field marshals
British people of Danish descent
British people of German descent
British people of Russian descent
British royal consorts
Burials at St George's Chapel, Windsor Castle
Chancellors of the University of Cambridge
Chancellors of the University of Edinburgh
Chancellors of the University of Salford
Chartered designers
Danish princes
Deified people
Dragon class sailors
Dukes of Edinburgh
Earls of Merioneth
English polo players
Fellows of the Royal Society (Statute 12)
Field marshals of Australia
Freemasons of the United Grand Lodge of England
Graduates of Britannia Royal Naval College
Greek emigrants to the United Kingdom
Greek princes
Edinburgh
Honorary fellows of the Royal Microscopical Society
House of Glücksburg (Greece)
House of Windsor
Lord High Admirals
Lords of the Admiralty
Marshals of the Royal Air Force
Members of the Privy Council of the United Kingdom
Members of the King's Privy Council for Canada
Members of Trinity House
Monarchy in Australia
Monarchy in Canada
Monarchy in New Zealand
Naturalised citizens of the United Kingdom
Nobility from Corfu
Dukes created by George VI
People educated at Cheam School
People educated at Gordonstoun
Presidents of the Football Association
Presidents of the Marylebone Cricket Club
Presidents of the Smeatonian Society of Civil Engineers
Presidents of the Zoological Society of London
 
Princes of the United Kingdom
Royal Australian Air Force air marshals
Royal Canadian Regiment
Royal Marines generals
Royal Navy admirals of the fleet
Royal Navy officers of World War II
Royal reburials
Vanuatu deities